Twiggy is a 2011 French drama film directed by Emmanuelle Millet.

Plot 
Sarah is 20 years old. She lives in a home for young workers and works at a museum in Marseille, where she hopes to achieve tenure soon. She enjoys her life as a young single woman. One day she discovers that the museum has decided not to hire her. Without work she will have to leave her home and as if this weren't enough, she discovers that she is six months pregnant.

Cast 

 Christa Théret as Sarah Dol
 Johan Libéreau as Thomas
 Anne Le Ny as Sonia
 Maud Wyler as Julie
 Myriam Bella as Leila
 Emilie Chesnais as Marie
 Cathy Ruiz as Sylvie
 Dimitri Mazzuchini as David
 Maéva Fertier as Lola
 Gabrielle Malésis as Nadège
 Léa Ambrogiani as Zoé
 Lili Sagit as Léa
 Amandine Arrighi as Milka
 Laure Grandbesançon as Nina
 Lucile Aknin as Marie-Eve
 Chloé Trombella as Angèle
 Manuel Diaz as Abel
 Nicolas Marié as The doctor
 Albert Dupontel as The museum director
 Laure Duthilleul as The consultant

Accolades

References

External links 

2011 films
French drama films
2011 drama films
2010s French films